The Alliance for Democracy and Development (ADD) is a political party in Zambia.

History
The party was established on 14 May 2010 by independent MP Charles Milupi. As he had changed party affiliation, Milupi was required to stand down as an MP, resulting in a by-election in which he was re-elected. He was the party's presidential candidate for the 2011 general elections; he finished fourth in a field of ten candidates with 0.9% of the vote. In the elections to the National Assembly the party received 1.2% of the vote, winning a single seat; its candidate Mwambwa Imenda won Milupi's former Luena constituency.

References

Political parties in Zambia
Political parties established in 2010
2010 establishments in Zambia